Sir Thomas Astley Woollaston White, 5th Baronet of Tuxford and Wallingwells (13 May 1904 - 16 May 1996) was the son of Sir Archibald White, 4th Baronet.

Family 
Sir Thomas married Daphne Margaret Athill on 8 July 1935, whereupon she became Lady White. The couple spent their honeymoon at Barrogill Castle, which was bought in 1952 by Queen Elizabeth The Queen Mother, and renamed the Castle of Mey.

Sir Thomas and his family lived on the Torhousemuir Estate, near Wigtown in Dumfries and Galloway. His father bought the estate in 1944 from Lord John FitzRoy.

The sole child of Sir Thomas and Lady White was Bridget Juliet White, born on 31 August 1935.

Death and succession 
Sir Thomas died on 16 May 1996 after suffering health problems for some time.
As he had a daughter and no son, the title passed on to his nephew, Sir Nicholas White, 6th Baronet, the son of Sir Thomas's late-brother Captain Richard Taylor White, RN DSO**.

Lady White died on 20 December 2012 (the 210th anniversary of the creation of the baronetcy), aged 99.

References

1904 births
1996 deaths
Baronets in the Baronetage of the United Kingdom
English people by rank